José Ramón Barea Monge (born 13 July 1949), known as Ramón Barea, is a Spanish actor.

Biography 
José Ramón Barea Monge was born in Bilbao on 13 July 1949. Barea made his feature film debut in the 1981 film .

Selected filmography

References

External links 

1949 births
Actors from the Basque Country (autonomous community)
People from Bilbao
Living people
Spanish male film actors
20th-century Spanish male actors
21st-century Spanish male actors